The Manchu people in Taiwan constitute a small minority of the population of Taiwan.

Migration history
The Manchu people living in Taiwan arrived primarily in two waves of migration. The first wave was during the Qing dynasty era, in which the Manchu-led government annexed Taiwan into the Qing Empire. The second wave was immediately following the Chinese Civil War, when the Kuomintang retreated to Taiwan. , there are about 12,000 Manchu people living in Taiwan.

Notable people

Puru - artist and cousin of China's last emperor Puyi. He fled to Taiwan in 1949.
Sihung Lung - actor in the Taiwanese cinema who appeared in over 100 films, best known for playing paternal roles in films including Eat Drink Man Woman and The Wedding Banquet.
Chyi Chin - Taiwanese singer and songwriter.
Chyi Yu - Taiwanese singer and songwriter.
King Pu-tsung - Taiwanese politician currently serving as Secretary-General of the Kuomintang party.
Doze Niu - Taiwanese film director, best known for the Taiwanese film Monga.
John Kuan -  president of the Examination Yuan of the Republic of China.
Bo Wenyue (鮑文樾) - one of the main participants in the Xi'an Incident and was held under arrest in Taiwan until 1975.

See also
Jiu Manzhou Dang, a set of Manchu archives stored at the National Palace Museum in Taipei, Taiwan

References

External links
 Republic of China Manchu Society
 Manchu Studies at National Chung Cheng University
 Lapen Publishers (Manchu publisher in Taipei)

Manchu people
Chinese culture in Taiwan
History of Taiwan